Edin Džeko, a Bosnian association footballer, made his debut for Bosnia and Herzegovina in a 3–2 win over Turkey on 2 June 2007. He also scored his first international goal in the match to level the scores at 2–2 in stoppage time of the first half. As of 26 September 2022, Džeko has scored 64 goals in 126 international appearances, making him Bosnia and Herzegovina's all-time leading goalscorer. He is also 31st on the list of men's footballers with 50 or more international goals and 9th on only the UEFA list.

On 8 September 2012, Džeko scored his first international hat-trick in an 8–1 World Cup qualification win over Liechtenstein. This brought him up to 24 international goals, surpassing the record of 22 set by Elvir Bolić and Zvjezdan Misimović. Liechtenstein are also the team that Džeko has scored more times against than any other, with six goals against them.

The majority of Džeko's goals have come in qualifying matches. He has scored 25 goals in World Cup qualifiers, including nine during the 2010 World Cup qualification round, where he finished as the joint second-highest scorer, alongside England's Wayne Rooney and one behind Greece's Theofanis Gekas. Džeko has also scored sixteen goals in European Championship qualifiers (including one in the 2016 play-offs), and six goals in the UEFA Nations League. He has only scored once in the World Cup finals, in a 3–1 win against Iran during the 2014 group stage. The remainder of Džeko's goals, fifteen, have come in friendlies.

International goals
Scores and results list Bosnia and Herzegovina's goal tally first.

|-
!scope="row"|1
|| 2 June 2007 || Asim Ferhatović Hase Stadium, Sarajevo, Bosnia and Herzegovina ||  ||  ||  || UEFA Euro 2008 qualifying
|-
!scope="row"|2
| rowspan=2 | 10 September 2008 || rowspan=2 | Bilino Polje Stadium, Zenica, Bosnia and Herzegovina || rowspan=2 |  ||  || rowspan=2 style="text-align:center;" | 7–0 || rowspan=4 | 2010 FIFA World Cup qualification
|-
!scope="row"|3
| 
|-
!scope="row"|4
| 11 October 2008 || BJK İnönü Stadium, Istanbul, Turkey ||  ||  || 
|-
!scope="row"|5
| 15 October 2008 || Bilino Polje Stadium, Zenica, Bosnia and Herzegovina ||  ||  || 
|-
!scope="row"|6
| 20 November 2008 || Ljudski vrt, Maribor, Slovenia ||  ||  ||  || Friendly
|-
!scope="row"|7
| 28 March 2009 || Cristal Stadium, Genk, Belgium || rowspan=3 |  ||  ||  || rowspan=3 | 2010 FIFA World Cup qualification
|-
!scope="row"|8
| rowspan=2 | 1 April 2009
| rowspan=2 | Bilino Polje Stadium, Zenica, Bosnia and Herzegovina ||  || rowspan=2 style="text-align:center;" | 2–1
|-
!scope="row"|9
| 
|-
!scope="row"|10
| 6 June 2009 || Stade Pierre de Coubertin, Cannes, France ||  ||  ||  || rowspan=3 | Friendly
|-
!scope="row"|11
| rowspan=2 | 12 August 2009 || rowspan=2 | Asim Ferhatović Hase Stadium, Sarajevo, Bosnia and Herzegovina || rowspan=2 |  ||  || rowspan=2 style="text-align:center;" | 2–3
|-
!scope="row"|12
| 
|-
!scope="row"|13
 || 10 October 2009 || A. Le Coq Arena, Tallinn, Estonia ||  ||  ||  || rowspan=2 | 2010 FIFA World Cup qualification
|-
!scope="row"|14
| 14 October 2009 || Bilino Polje Stadium, Zenica, Bosnia and Herzegovina ||  ||  || 
|-
!scope="row"|15
| 3 June 2010 || Commerzbank-Arena, Frankfurt, Germany ||  ||  ||  || Friendly
|-
!scope="row"|16
| 3 September 2010 || |Stade Josy Barthel, Luxembourg City, Luxembourg ||  ||  ||  || UEFA Euro 2012 qualifying
|-
!scope="row"|17
| 17 November 2010 || |Štadión Pasienky, Bratislava, Slovakia ||  ||  ||  || Friendly
|-
!scope="row"|18
| 26 March 2011 || rowspan=2 | Bilino Polje Stadium, Zenica, Bosnia and Herzegovina ||  ||  ||  ||  rowspan=3 | UEFA Euro 2012 qualifying
|-
!scope="row"|19
| 7 October 2011 ||  ||  || 
|-
!scope="row"|20
| 11 October 2011 || Stade de France, Paris, France ||  ||  || 
|-
!scope="row"|21
| 1 June 2012 || Soldier Field, Chicago, United States ||  ||  ||  || Friendly
|-
!scope="row"|22
| rowspan=3 | 7 September 2012 || rowspan=3 | Rheinpark Stadion, Vaduz, Liechtenstein || rowspan=3 |  ||  || rowspan=3 style="text-align:center;" | 8–1 || rowspan=8 | 2014 FIFA World Cup qualification
|-
!scope="row"|23
| 
|-
!scope="row"|24
| 
|-
!scope="row"|25
| 11 September 2012 || rowspan=4 | Bilino Polje Stadium, Zenica, Bosnia and Herzegovina ||  ||  || 
|-
!scope="row"|26
| 16 October 2012 ||  ||  || 
|-
!scope="row"|27
| rowspan=2 | 22 March 2013 || rowspan=2 |  ||  || rowspan=2 style="text-align:center;" | 3–1
|-
!scope="row"|28
| 
|-
!scope="row"|29
| 7 June 2013 || Skonto Stadium, Riga, Latvia ||  ||  || 
|-
!scope="row"|30
| rowspan=2 | 14 August 2013 || rowspan=2 | Asim Ferhatović Hase Stadium, Sarajevo, Bosnia and Herzegovina || rowspan=2 |  ||  || rowspan=2 style="text-align:center;" | 3–4 || rowspan=2 | Friendly
|-
!scope="row"|31
| 
|-
!scope="row"|32
| rowspan=2 | 11 October 2013 || rowspan=2 | Bilino Polje Stadium, Zenica, Bosnia and Herzegovina || rowspan=2 |  ||  || rowspan=2 style="text-align:center;" | 4–1 || rowspan=2 | 2014 FIFA World Cup qualification
|-
!scope="row"|33
| 
|-
!scope="row"|34
| rowspan=2 | 30 May 2014 || rowspan=2 | Edward Jones Dome, St. Louis, United States || rowspan=2 |  ||  || rowspan=2 style="text-align:center;" | 2–1 || rowspan=2 | Friendly
|-
!scope="row"|35
| 
|-
!scope="row"|36
| 25 June 2014 || Arena Fonte Nova, Salvador, Brazil ||  ||  ||  || 2014 FIFA World Cup
|-
!scope="row"|37
| 4 September 2014 || Tušanj City Stadium, Tuzla, Bosnia and Herzegovina ||  ||  ||  || Friendly
|-
!scope="row"|38
| 13 October 2014 || Bilino Polje Stadium, Zenica, Bosnia and Herzegovina ||  ||  ||  || rowspan=7 | UEFA Euro 2016 qualifying
|-
!scope="row"|39
| rowspan=3 | 28 March 2015 || rowspan=3 | Estadi Nacional, Andorra la Vella, Andorra || rowspan=3 |  ||  || rowspan=3 style="text-align:center;" | 3–0
|-
!scope="row"|40
| 
|-
!scope="row"|41
| 
|-
!scope="row"|42
| 12 June 2015 || Bilino Polje Stadium, Zenica, Bosnia and Herzegovina ||  ||  || 
|-
!scope="row"|43
| 3 September 2015 || King Baudouin Stadium, Brussels, Belgium ||  ||  || 
|-
!scope="row"|44
| 6 September 2015 || Bilino Polje Stadium, Zenica, Bosnia and Herzegovina ||  ||  || 
|-
!scope="row"|45
| 13 November 2015 || Bilino Polje Stadium, Zenica, Bosnia and Herzegovina ||  ||  ||  || UEFA Euro 2016 qualifying play-offs
|-
!scope="row"|46
| 29 March 2016 || Letzigrund, Zürich, Switzerland ||  ||  ||  || Friendly
|-
!scope="row"|47
| 6 September 2016 || Bilino Polje Stadium, Zenica, Bosnia and Herzegovina ||  ||  ||  || rowspan=3 | 2018 FIFA World Cup qualification
|-
!scope="row"|48
| rowspan=2 | 10 October 2016 || rowspan=2 | Bilino Polje Stadium, Zenica, Bosnia and Herzegovina || rowspan=2 |  ||  || rowspan=2 style="text-align:center;" |  2–0
|-
!scope="row"|49
| 
|-
!scope="row"|50
| 28 March 2017 || Elbasan Arena, Elbasan, Albania ||  ||  ||  || Friendly
|-
!scope="row"|51
| rowspan=2 | 3 September 2017 || rowspan=2 | Estádio Algarve, Faro, Portugal || rowspan=2 |  ||  || rowspan=2 style="text-align:center;" |  4–0 ||rowspan=2 | 2018 FIFA World Cup qualification
|-
!scope="row"|52
| 
|-
!scope="row"|53
| 11 September 2018 || Bilino Polje Stadium, Zenica, Bosnia and Herzegovina ||  ||  ||  || rowspan=3| 2018–19 UEFA Nations League B
|-
!scope="row"|54
| rowspan=2 | 15 October 2018 || rowspan=2 | Stadion Grbavica, Sarajevo, Bosnia and Herzegovina || rowspan=2 |  ||  || rowspan=2 style="text-align:center;" |  2–0
|-
!scope="row"|55
| 
|-
!scope="row"|56
| 11 June 2019 || Juventus Stadium, Turin, Italy ||  ||  ||  || rowspan=3| UEFA Euro 2020 qualifying
|-
!scope="row"|57
| 5 September 2019 || Bilino Polje Stadium, Zenica, Bosnia and Herzegovina ||  ||  || 
|-
!scope="row"|58
| 8 September 2019 || Vazgen Sargsyan Republican Stadium, Yerevan, Armenia ||  ||  || 
|-
!scope="row"|59
|4 September 2020 || Stadio Artemio Franchi, Florence, Italy ||  ||  ||  || 2020–21 UEFA Nations League A
|-
!scope="row"|60
|1 September 2021 || Stade de la Meinau, Strasbourg, France ||  ||  ||  || 2022 FIFA World Cup qualification
|-
!scope="row"|61
|29 March 2022 || Bilino Polje Stadium, Zenica, Bosnia and Herzegovina ||  ||  ||  || Friendly
|-
!scope="row"|62
| rowspan=2 | 14 June 2022 || rowspan=2 | Bilino Polje Stadium, Zenica, Bosnia and Herzegovina || rowspan=2 |  ||  || rowspan=2 style="text-align:center;" |  3–2 || rowspan=3 | 2022–23 UEFA Nations League B
|-
!scope="row"|63
| 
|-
!scope="row"|64
|26 September 2022 || Stadionul Rapid-Giulești, Bucharest, Romania ||  ||  || 
|}

Statistics

See also

Bosnia and Herzegovina national football team records and statistics
Idol Nacije

References

Dzeko